HTC One X9 is a touchscreen, slate smartphone designed and manufactured by HTC. It was released running Android 6.0, (Marshmallow) with the HTC Sense skin overlay. The One X9 was announced on December 2015 and released in China in January 2016.

HTC smartphones
Android (operating system) devices
Mobile phones introduced in 2016